is a Japanese retired Grand Prix motorcycle road racer, and current team principal of Honda Team Asia. Aoyama is best known for winning the 2009 250cc World Championship title. He is the older brother of former 250cc and World Superbike rider, Shuhei Aoyama.

In his six seasons in the 250cc World Championship, he raced Honda and KTM machinery in an Aprilia-dominated class. He took nine victories and never finished lower than seventh overall. By winning the 2009 250cc World Championship, Aoyama become the last winner of this class before its replacement by the Moto2 class in 2010. In 2010 he moved up to the premier class with Interwetten Racing. He stopped competing in MotoGP after the 2014 season and took on the role of HRC test rider and advisor to riders in the Shell Advance Asia Talent Cup.

Career

Early career
Born in Ichihara, Chiba, Aoyama first raced in MiniMoto at the age of 4, racing against Yuki Takahashi, who he has raced against for most of his career. In 2008 he referred to Takahashi as a "respected rival".

He rode in the All-Japan Road Racing Championship until 2003, when he won the 250cc championship with Honda. He also rode a couple of events as wildcard rider in the Grand Prix World Championships, finishing 2nd in the 2003 Japanese Grand Prix at Suzuka.

125cc, 250cc & MotoGP World Championship

In 2004 he joined the 250cc World Championship full-time, still racing for Honda. His debut season gave him two third places and 6th place in the championship. In the following year he scored his maiden victory in his home race at Motegi and finished the championship in 4th place.

However, he was not able to stay on at Honda, so he moved to KTM for 2006 season. He brought them victories in Istanbul and Motegi, the first two for the manufacturer in the class. For the second year in row, he was 4th in overall standings.

Aoyama ended the 2007 season in sixth place in the 250 championship with victories in Germany and Malaysia. He remained with KTM for the 2008 season and finished the season in seventh place with two second-place finishes.

After KTM's withdrawal from 250cc class, Aoyama returned to Honda with Team Scot replacing his rival Yuki Takahashi who briefly moved up to MotoGP class. The 2009 season went well as he scored 4 wins, 3 second places and finished every other race in the points. At last race of the season Aoyama became the world champion.

Aoyama stepped up to MotoGP in 2010 on board the Emmi-Caffè Latte Team Honda RC212V. In initial testing the team (which is itself new to MotoGP) opted not to use the electronic rider aids, despite the bikes being designed around them. The team's technical director Tom Jojic explained that he wanted Aoyama to experience the bike's true nature, and believes that he is good enough to be competitive on it. His season was wrecked by a fractured vertebra sustained in a practice crash at Silverstone, eliminating him for much of the season.

Aoyama was a consistent race finisher in 2011, mainly finishing in the bottom end of the top ten, but finished fourth in the Spanish Grand Prix. Aoyama also replaced Dani Pedrosa on the factory-spec Repsol Honda bike for the Dutch TT in Assen, after Pedrosa's injury at the French Grand Prix. Aoyama moved to World Superbikes for the  season, joining Jonathan Rea at Castrol Honda.

Career statistics

Grand Prix motorcycle racing

By season

By class

Races by year
(key) (Races in bold indicate pole position, races in italics indicate fastest lap)

Superbike World Championship

By season

Races by year
(key) (Races in bold indicate pole position, races in italics indicate fastest lap)

References

External links

Japanese motorcycle racers
1981 births
Living people
People from Ichihara, Chiba
Sportspeople from Chiba Prefecture
250cc World Championship riders
Repsol Honda MotoGP riders
Superbike World Championship riders
Avintia Racing MotoGP riders
Gresini Racing MotoGP riders
Aspar Racing Team MotoGP riders
Marc VDS Racing Team MotoGP riders
MotoGP World Championship riders
250cc World Riders' Champions